The Liberty Memorial (Danish: Frihedsstøtten), located in front of Central Station in Copenhagen, Denmark, is a 20 meter tall obelisque erected in memory of the peasant reforms in 1788 which led to the abolition of serfdom (Danish: Stavnsbåndet).

Design
The 20 metre tall obelisque is made of sandstone from Nexø on Bornholm and its base is made of Norwegian marble. The four female figures at the base of the obelisque symbolise Bravery, Civic Virtue, Fidelity and the Industrious Cultivation of Land.

History

 
The architect and painter Nicolai Abildgaard was charged with the design of the monument. The four statues and two reliefs were created by Johannes Wiedewelt, Nicolai Dajon and Andreas Weidenhaupt. The foundation stone was set by Crown Prince Frederick (VI), on 21 September 1792 and it was completed in September 1797.

 
The column was renovated for the first time in 1850–51. It was dismantled in connection with the construction of the current Central Station and the Boulevard Line in the 1900s and a copy executed by the sculptor Kens Lunde was later installed 5 metres to the east of its original location. The adjacent streets  Bernstorffsgade and Reventlowsgade, running on each their side of the central station, and Colbjørnsensgade, situated one block further to the west, were named for Andreas Peter Bernstorff, Christian Ditlev Frederik Reventlow and Christian Colbjørnsen, three of the driving forces behind the peasant reforms. In 1999, it was reinaugurated after another renovation.

See also
 Sculpture of Denmark

References

External links

Listed monuments and memorials in Copenhagen
Obelisks in Denmark
Buildings and structures completed in 1797